"Shy Boy" is the eighth single by Georgian-born singer Katie Melua and the fifth from her second album, Piece by Piece (2005).

In the UK the single was released as download-only single, whereas in some European countries there was a physical CD release. The song was then released in Poland, where Melua's preceding singles "Spider's Web" and "It's Only Pain" reached the top five on the airplay chart, and Piece by Piece lead single "Nine Million Bicycles" topped the chart.

After 3 weeks on charting below the Top 20, the single finally peaked at #1 in Polish National Top 50, making "Shy Boy" her second number one single in Poland.

Track listings 
 "Shy Boy"
 "Fancy" (live)
 "Have Yourself a Merry Little Christmas"

Charts

References

External links
Katie Melua web site
Video

2006 singles
Katie Melua songs
Songs written by Mike Batt
Song recordings produced by Mike Batt